The 1924 United States presidential election in Arkansas was held on November 4, 1924, as part of the 1924 United States presidential election. State voters chose nine electors, or representatives to the Electoral College, who voted for President and Vice-President.

Background and vote
Except for the Unionist Ozark counties of Newton and Searcy where Republicans controlled local government, Arkansas since the end of Reconstruction had been a classic one-party Democratic “Solid South” state. Disfranchisement during the 1890s of effectively all Negroes and most poor whites had meant that outside those two aberrant counties, the Republican Party was completely moribund and Democratic primaries the only competitive elections. Although the northwest of the state was to develop a strong Socialist Party movement that served as a swing vote in county elections, political repression and internal party divisions diminished that party’s strength substantially.

The Democratic Party, under the influence of future federal Senate Minority and Majority Leader Joseph Taylor Robinson and demagogic Governor and Senator Jeff Davis, was to make many familiar progressive changes in railroad regulation and child labor, but under the administration of George W. Donaghey – who saw his administration and Democratic primary candidacy as a fight against the “Davis Machine” – more rapid development occurred, especially in abolishing convict leasing and improving bank regulation.

Race riots and fear of the Bolshevik Revolution spreading and destroying American capitalism ensued when many soldiers returned from World War I, and President Woodrow Wilson responded with the Palmer Raids and a “Red Scare”. Isolationism was sufficiently powerful in Ozark sections of Arkansas that Warren G. Harding, with almost forty percent of the statewide vote in 1920, gained the most support for any GOP candidate since disfranchisement of Black Americans.

However, with the anti-Democratic opposition split and isolationism cooling, Davis more than doubled James M. Cox’s 1920 margin. Republican Coolidge – though winning a national landslide and carrying every state except the former Confederacy plus culturally and politically allied Oklahoma – carried as Charles Evans Hughes did eight years previously only the two traditional Unionist Ozark counties.

Results

Results by county

See also
 United States presidential elections in Arkansas

Notes

References

Arkansas
1924